The Misadventures of Saint Etienne (1999) is an album by Saint Etienne. Released only in Japan, it served as the soundtrack to a British indie film called The Misadventures of Margaret, starring Parker Posey.

The soundtrack was recorded during winter 1997 just before the period when the band were starting to promote the Good Humor album, Sarah Cracknell said in an interview with Melody Maker that "Saturday" was being remixed by Trouser Enthusiasts as a possible single release. The single and remix never appeared, and the film itself was only released in Spanish cinemas.

Other tracks recorded for the film (but left off the soundtrack) include "Secret Love", a duet between Cracknell and Posey, "Sadie's Anniversary" and "Half Timbered". The last two were later released on the Places to Visit EP.

Track listing

References 

Saint Etienne (band) albums
1999 soundtrack albums
Comedy film soundtracks